Fabrice Santoro was the defending champion but lost in the second round to Sjeng Schalken.

Roger Federer won in the final 6–1, 7–6(7–2) against Jiří Novák. He did not lose a single set in the entire tournament.

Seeds
A champion seed is indicated in bold text while text in italics indicates the round in which that seed was eliminated.

  Roger Federer (champion)
  Marat Safin (second round)
  Jiří Novák (final)
  Tim Henman (first round)
  Rainer Schüttler (quarterfinals)
  Sjeng Schalken (quarterfinals)
  Younes El Aynaoui (second round)
  Yevgeny Kafelnikov (second round)

Draw

External links
 2003 Dubai Tennis Championships Draw

2003 Dubai Tennis Championships and Duty Free Women's Open
Singles